Montana Highway 200 (MT 200) in the U.S. state of Montana is a route running east–west covering the entire state of Montana. From the starting point at ID 200, near Heron, the highway runs east to ND 200 near Fairview. At , Montana Highway 200 is also the longest route signed as a state highway in the United States. Highway 200 helps to connect many small towns located in central Montana and the vast plains area of eastern Montana, to larger western Montana cities such as Great Falls and Missoula.

Route description 

At its western end at the Idaho state line, MT 200 follows the Clark Fork River at the feet of the Cabinet Mountains eastward for  until it meets the Flathead River at MT 135. The two highways share a  concurrency and travel south I-90, where they head east into Missoula. The highway runs parallel to the Blackfoot River and is subject to hazardous driving conditions in the winter, particularly due to black ice.

In Great Falls, MT 200 and US 89 leave I-15, where they become concurrent with MT 3, share a brief concurrency with I-315 (I-15 Business), and merge with US 87, following 10th Avenue South eastward through the city. At Eddie's Corner (near Moore), the routes meet US 191 where MT 3 and US 191 share a common alignment to Harlowton. US 87, US 191, and MT 200 share a  concurrency to Lewistown, where US 191 heads north, and US 87/MT 200 continue another  to Grass Range.

MT 200 follows the following MDT corridors:

History
Today's Highway 200 is part of a four-state chain of such routes, but it did not begin that way. It was assembled from other state and federal routes over the years.

The status of the routes and route segments that became Highway 200 in 1937.
 The section from the Idaho line to Ravalli was the original MT 3.
 No concurrency from Ravalli to Missoula on US 93 or US 10.
 The section from Bonner to Sun River was then MT 20, and much was yet to be constructed. The route even followed segments of today's MT 21 to Augusta and future US 287 (then MT 33).
 No concurrency from Sun River to Grass Range along US 87.
 The section from Grass Range to Circle was part of the original MT 18.
 The remainder of MT 18 ran from Circle to Glendive, today's MT 200S.
 The section from Circle to Sidney was Montana 23, ending at then MT 14.
 MT 14 ran the rest of the way to Fairview.

By 1941, US 10 Alternate (US 10A) had replaced MT 3 as part of an alternate route from Wye to Spokane via Sandpoint and was now concurrent with US 93 to US 10.

Between 1948 and 1959, many construction projects and route redesignations with concurrencies made MT 20 from Bonner to Sidney the baseline for today's MT 200. MT 23N replaced MT 14 from Sidney to Fairview and MT 20S replaced MT 18 from Circle to Glendive.

In 1960, MT 20 picked up the Sidney to Fairview segment.

By 1969, the entire MT 20 had become MT 200 and included the former US 10A from Idaho to Wye, and following US 10/93 through Missoula. MT 20S became 200S.

Major junctions

Related route

Montana Highway 200S (MT 200S) is a spur route of MT 200 that branches off the main route near Circle and ends at the I-94 business loop in Glendive. MT 200S was originally part of MT 18, renamed MT 20S when MT 23 from Circle to Sidney was renamed MT 20 and received its current name when MT 20 was renamed MT 200.

Major intersections

See also

References

External links

 Historical Highway Maps from MDT

200
Transportation in Sanders County, Montana
Transportation in Lake County, Montana
Transportation in Missoula County, Montana
Transportation in Powell County, Montana
Transportation in Lewis and Clark County, Montana
Transportation in Cascade County, Montana
Transportation in Judith Basin County, Montana
Transportation in Fergus County, Montana
Transportation in Petroleum County, Montana
Transportation in Garfield County, Montana
Transportation in McCone County, Montana
Transportation in Dawson County, Montana
Transportation in Richland County, Montana